is a Japanese role-playing video game series initially developed and published by Data East and owned by the Paon Corporation and Nintendo. The series began in 1987 with Tōjin Makyō Den: Heracles no Eikō, and three sequels were released until 1994 in addition to a portable spin-off game released in 1992.

After Data East's bankruptcy in 2003, Paon Corporation and Nintendo acquired the rights to the series, with Paon (now Paon DP) and Nintendo co-owning the copyright and Nintendo solely owning the trademark, and Nintendo released the latest installment in the series, Heracles no Eikō: Tamashii no Shōmei for the Nintendo DS in 2008. None of the games had been released outside Japan until E3 2009, at which the latest game was announced by Nintendo as Glory of Heracles.

The series is based in the world of Greek mythology, with the Greek hero Heracles as the title character of each game. However, Heracles only serves as the main character in the original game and the Game Boy spin-off, and plays a support role in all subsequent games.

The 2018 game Super Smash Bros. Ultimate represented the series in the game's spirit mode, with Heracles from the original game and the player character for the DS game, named as the Glory of Heracles Hero, possible to unlock.

Games

References

External links
Nintendo E3 2009: Glory of Heracles
Glory of Heracles (Nintendo DS) official website 
Heracles no Eikō: Tamashii no Shōmei official website 

Video game franchises
Super Nintendo Entertainment System games
Role-playing video games
Video games set in antiquity
Video games based on Greek mythology
Video game franchises introduced in 1987
Video games developed in Japan